The Tyger Valley Shopping Centre is a shopping mall located in Bellville, Western Cape and owned by development company Pareto. It opened in 1985 and has gone through multiple refurbishments and expansions with the most recent being done in 2012. The mall has a retail area of 90,382m², 243 stores, four floors, and 6,000 parking bays. Its anchors include Pick n Pay, Game, Edgars, Woolworths and Ster-Kinekor cinemas.

References

Shopping malls established in 1985
Shopping centres in Cape Town